Ring of Fire is a trade paperback collecting comic stories based on the Buffy the Vampire Slayer television series.

Story line

In the aftermath of Jenny Calendar's death at the hands of Angelus, Giles' grief is mixed with fury. Buffy feels uneasy with her mentor's inability to cope with the death of Jenny. Meanwhile, the armor of a samurai demon is taken from a cargo ship. The demon had been named Kelgor, who in 1500 raised an army of the dead and caused havoc and death in Japan. Angelus, Spike and Dru hope to utilise the armour for power of epic proportions. A new confrontation is developing over who can be the master the Ring of Fire, and with Giles barely functioning sanely, Buffy, Willow, Xander, and Kendra must try to avert a disaster.

Continuity
Set during Buffy's second season, shortly after "Passion".

Canonical issues

With the exception of the season 8 comics also released by Dark Horse, which are written by Joss Whedon, Buffy comics are not usually considered by fans as canonical. However, unlike fan fiction, overviews summarising their story, written early in the writing process, were 'approved' by both Fox and Joss Whedon (or his office), and the books were therefore later published as official Buffy merchandise.

Willow is seen performing a highly complex spell and is identified by Kendra as a witch, but Willow didn't become interested in magic until 2.19 "I Only Have Eyes For You" and performed her first proper spell in 2.22 "Becoming, Part Two"

External links
BBC - Cult - Buffy the Vampire Slayer Ecomics This comic is available free as an ecomic from the BBC website.

Comics based on Buffy the Vampire Slayer